Maliangia is a monotypic moth genus of the family Erebidae. Its only species, Maliangia geometriformis, is found in northern Yunnan province of China. Both the genus and the species were first described by Emilio Berio in 1977.

References

Calpinae
Monotypic moth genera